Novosibirsk Research Institute of Traumatology and Orthopedics named after Y. L. Tsivyan is a medical organization in Novosibirsk, Russia, that specializes in orthopedic surgery, the treatment of rheumatologic conditions and scientific research of diseases of the musculoskeletal system. It was founded in 1946.

History
The medical organization was created in 1946 on the basis of evacuation hospital No. 1239, which was located in the building of the Bookselling Technical School on Frunze Street.

Initially, the institute specialized in the surgical treatment of people who received various injuries during the Second World War.

In 2015, for the first time in Russia, the institute's doctors implanted nanoceramic hip joint implant made in Russia (it was made in Novosibirsk by NEVZ-Keramiks). A hip joint prosthesis was implanted free of charge to a resident of Birobidzhan.

See also
 Meshalkin National Medical Research Center

Bibliography

References

External links
 NIITO solemnly celebrated its 70th anniversary НИИТО торжественно отметил 70-летний юбилей. Вечерний Новосибирск.

Research institutes in Novosibirsk
Hospitals in Novosibirsk
Tsentralny City District, Novosibirsk
Orthopedic organizations
1946 establishments in the Soviet Union
Hospitals established in 1946
Medical research institutes in the Soviet Union
Health in the Soviet Union